Carbon tetrachloride, also known by many other names (such as tetrachloromethane, also recognised by the IUPAC, carbon tet in the cleaning industry, Halon-104 in firefighting, and Refrigerant-10 in HVACR) is a chemical compound with the chemical formula CCl4. It is a colourless liquid with a "sweet" smell that can be detected at low levels. It is practically incombustible at lower temperatures. It was formerly widely used in fire extinguishers, as a precursor to refrigerants and as a cleaning agent, but has since been phased out because of environmental and safety concerns. Exposure to high concentrations of carbon tetrachloride (including vapor) can affect the central nervous system and degenerate the liver and kidneys. Prolonged exposure can be fatal.

Properties
In the carbon tetrachloride molecule, four chlorine atoms are positioned symmetrically as corners in a tetrahedral configuration joined to a central carbon atom by single covalent bonds. Because of this symmetric geometry, CCl4 is non-polar. Methane gas has the same structure, making carbon tetrachloride a halomethane. As a solvent, it is well suited to dissolving other non-polar compounds such as fats and oils. It can also dissolve iodine. It is volatile, giving off vapors with a smell characteristic of other chlorinated solvents, somewhat similar to the tetrachloroethylene smell reminiscent of dry cleaners' shops.

Solid tetrachloromethane has two polymorphs: crystalline II below −47.5 °C (225.6 K) and crystalline I above −47.5 °C. At −47.3 °C it has monoclinic crystal structure with space group C2/c and lattice constants a = 20.3, b = 11.6, c = 19.9 (.10−1 nm), β = 111°.

With a specific gravity greater than 1, carbon tetrachloride will be present as a dense nonaqueous phase liquid if sufficient quantities are spilled in the environment.

History and synthesis
Carbon tetrachloride was originally synthesized by Michael Faraday who named it "protochloride of carbon" in 1820 via decomposition of hexachloroethane ("perchloride of carbon") which he synthesized by chlorination of ethylene but now it is mainly produced from methane:

CH4  +  4 Cl2   →   CCl4  +  4 HCl

The production often utilizes by-products of other chlorination reactions, such as from the syntheses of dichloromethane and chloroform. Higher chlorocarbons are also subjected to this process named "chlorinolysis":

C2Cl6  +  Cl2  →  2 CCl4

Prior to the 1950s, carbon tetrachloride was manufactured by the chlorination of carbon disulfide at 105 to 130 °C:

CS2 + 3Cl2 → CCl4 + S2Cl2

The production of carbon tetrachloride has steeply declined since the 1980s due to environmental concerns and the decreased demand for CFCs, which were derived from carbon tetrachloride. In 1992, production in the U.S./Europe/Japan was estimated at 720,000 tonnes.

Safety
Carbon tetrachloride is one of the most potent hepatotoxins (toxic to the liver), so much so that it is widely used in scientific research to evaluate hepatoprotective agents. Exposure to high concentrations of carbon tetrachloride (including vapor) can affect the central nervous system and degenerate the liver and kidneys, and prolonged exposure may lead to coma or death. Chronic exposure to carbon tetrachloride can cause liver and kidney damage and could result in cancer. See safety data sheets.

The effects of carbon tetrachloride on human health and the environment have been assessed under REACH in 2012 in the context of the substance evaluation by France.

In 2008, a study of common cleaning products found the presence of carbon tetrachloride in "very high concentrations" (up to 101 mg/m3) as a result of manufacturers' mixing of surfactants or soap with sodium hypochlorite (bleach).

Carbon tetrachloride is also both ozone-depleting and a greenhouse gas. However, since 1992 its atmospheric concentrations have been in decline for the reasons described above (see atmospheric concentration graphs in the gallery). CCl4 has an atmospheric lifetime of 85 years.

At high temperatures in air, it decomposes or burns to produce poisonous phosgene.

Toxicological studies
Carbon tetrachloride is a suspected human carcinogen based on sufficient evidence of carcinogenicity from studies in experimental animals. The World Health Organization reports carbon tetrachloride can induce hepatocellular carcinomas (hepatomas) in mice and rats. The doses inducing hepatic tumours are higher than those inducing cell toxicity. The International Agency for Research on Cancer (IARC) classified this compound in Group 2B, "possibly carcinogenic to humans".

Uses
In organic chemistry, carbon tetrachloride serves as a source of chlorine in the Appel reaction.

Carbon tetrachloride made from heavy chlorine-37 has been used in the detection of neutrinos.

One specialty use of carbon tetrachloride is in stamp collecting, to reveal watermarks on postage stamps without damaging them. A small amount of the liquid is placed on the back of a stamp, sitting in a black glass or obsidian tray. The letters or design of the watermark can then be seen clearly.

Historical uses
Carbon tetrachloride was widely used as a dry cleaning solvent, as a refrigerant, and in lava lamps. In the last case, carbon tetrachloride is a key ingredient that adds weight to the otherwise buoyant wax.

Solvent
It once was a popular solvent in organic chemistry, but, because of its adverse health effects, it is rarely used today. It is sometimes useful as a solvent for infrared spectroscopy, because there are no significant absorption bands above 1600 cm−1. Because carbon tetrachloride does not have any hydrogen atoms, it was historically used in proton NMR spectroscopy. In addition to being toxic, its dissolving power is low. Its use in NMR spectroscopy has been largely superseded by deuterated solvents. Use of carbon tetrachloride in determination of oil has been replaced by various other solvents, such as tetrachloroethylene. Because it has no C–H bonds, carbon tetrachloride does not easily undergo free-radical reactions. It is a useful solvent for halogenations either by the elemental halogen or by a halogenation reagent such as N-bromosuccinimide (these conditions are known as Wohl–Ziegler bromination).

Fire suppression

In 1910, the Pyrene Manufacturing Company of Delaware filed a patent to use carbon tetrachloride to extinguish fires. The liquid was vaporized by the heat of combustion and extinguished flames, an early form of gaseous fire suppression. At the time it was believed the gas simply displaced oxygen in the area near the fire, but later research found that the gas actually inhibits the chemical chain reaction of the combustion process. 

In 1911, Pyrene patented a small, portable extinguisher that used the chemical. The extinguisher consisted of a brass bottle with an integrated hand-pump that was used to expel a jet of liquid toward the fire. As the container was unpressurized, it could easily be refilled after use. Carbon tetrachloride was suitable for liquid and electrical fires and the extinguishers were often carried on aircraft or motor vehicles. However as early as 1920, there were reports of fatalities caused by the chemical when used to fight a fire in a confined space.

In the first half of the 20th century, another common fire extinguisher was a single-use, sealed glass globe known as a "fire grenade", filled with either carbon tetrachloride or salt water. The bulb could be thrown at the base of the flames to quench the fire. The carbon tetrachloride type could also be installed in a spring-loaded wall fixture with a solder-based restraint. When the solder melted by high heat, the spring would either break the globe or launch it out of the bracket, allowing the extinguishing agent to be automatically dispersed into the fire.

A well-known brand of fire grenade was the "Red Comet", which was variously manufactured with other fire-fighting equipment in the Denver, Colorado area by the Red Comet Manufacturing Company from its founding in 1919 until manufacturing operations were closed in the early 1980s.

Refrigerants 
Prior to the Montreal Protocol, large quantities of carbon tetrachloride were used to produce the chlorofluorocarbon refrigerants R-11 (trichlorofluoromethane) and R-12 (dichlorodifluoromethane). However, these refrigerants play a role in ozone depletion and have been phased out. Carbon tetrachloride is still used to manufacture less destructive refrigerants.

Fumigant
Carbon tetrachloride was widely used as a fumigant to kill insect pests in stored grain. It was employed in a mixture known as 80/20, that was 80% carbon tetrachloride and 20% Carbon disulfide. The United States Environmental Protection Agency banned its use in 1985.

Gallery

References

External links

IARC Monograph: "Carbon Tetrachloride"
Toxicological profile for carbon tetrachloride
Environmental health criteria for carbon tetrachloride
Carbon tetrachloride MSDS at Hazardous Chemical Database
Substance profile at ntp.niehs.nih.gov
ChemSub Online: Carbon tetrachloride

Chloroalkanes
Halomethanes
Nonmetal halides
Greenhouse gases
Hazardous air pollutants
Organochloride insecticides
Refrigerants
Halogenated solvents
IARC Group 2B carcinogens
Dry cleaning
Hepatotoxins
Sweet-smelling chemicals